NSD1 (Nuclear receptor binding SET Domain Protein 1) is a transcription coregulator protein that encodes Histone Methyltransferase and is associated with Sotos syndrome and Weaver syndrome.

References

External links
  GeneReviews/NCBI/NIH/UW entry on Sotos Syndrome